Alessandro Bordini (born 8 August 1985) is an Italian blind man who travels the world alone with his stick and iPhone.

Biography
Bordini was born in the Province of Verona. His father was a wood craftsman. He attended the Italian public schools.
After completing his schooling, Bordina worked with his father. At age 21 he took up skydiving.

Accident and resolution
After skydiving regularly for three years Bordini was seriously injured in a landing accident. He lost his sight as a result of his injuries and it took several months of treatment and hospitalization before he was able to resume his life.

Bordini attended a seminar given by French motivation speaker Michelle J. Noel, in which the marvelous adaptive and recuperative powers of the human brain were discussed. This motivated Bordini to adapt a more positive outlook on his life. Three years after his accident, he embarked on an around-the-world journey of discovery.

In 2019 he wrote the book “Crescere al buio” (:it:Giacomo Bruno Publishing) that become Amazon Bestseller in 1 hours

References

1985 births
Living people
People from Verona
Italian blind people